Person of Interest: Season 2 is the second soundtrack of the American television series Person of Interest, composed by Ramin Djawadi, bringing together music used for the second season. Released in January 2014, the album includes twenty-three music composed specially for seasons 2 of Person of Interest.

The album contains only the creations of Ramin Djawadi, thus, all other music or songs used in the series are not present.

Track listing
All music by Ramin Djawadi.

Credits and personnel
Personnel adapted from the album liner notes.
 Stephen Coleman - Conductor
 Ramin Djawadi - Composer, Conductor, Primary Artist
 Hollywood Studio Symphony - Orchestra

References 

Album
2014 soundtrack albums
Ramin Djawadi soundtracks
Television soundtracks
Varèse Sarabande soundtracks